Sober usually refers to sobriety, the state of not having any measurable levels or effects from alcohol or drugs.

Sober may also refer to:

Music
 Sôber, Spanish rock band

Songs
 "Sober" (Bad Wolves song), from the 2019 album Nation
 "Sober" (Big Bang song), from the 2016 album Made
 "Sober" (Childish Gambino song), from the 2014 extended play, Kauai
  "Sober" (Demi Lovato song), 2018 single
 "Sober" (G-Eazy song), from the 2017 album The Beautiful & Damned
 "Sober" (Inna song), 2020 single
 "Sober" (Jennifer Paige song), from the 1999 album Jennifer Paige
 "Sober" (Kelly Clarkson song), from the 2007 album My December
 "Sober" (Little Big Town song), from the 2012 album Tornado
 "Sober" (Lorde song) and "Sober II (Melodrama)", two songs from the 2017 album Melodrama
 "Sober" (Loreen song),  from the 2012 album Heal
 "Sober" (Pink song), from the 2008 album Funhouse
 "Sober" (Selena Gomez song), from the 2015 album Revival
 "Sober" (Tool song), from the 1993 album Undertow
 "Sober", by Bazzi
 "Sober", by Blink-182 from the 2016 album California
 "Sober", by Cheat Codes
 "Sober", by Muse from the 1999 album Showbiz
 "Sober", by Sam Smith from the 2020 album Love Goes
 "Sober", by Fidlar from the 2015 album Too

People
 Bojan Sober (born 1957), Croatian opera singer
 Elliott Sober (born 1947), American philosopher of science
 Olga Sober, Serbian singer:

Places
 Sober Hall, village in Ingleby Barwick, England
 Sober Island, Nova Scotia
 Sober, Spain

Other
Sober Grid, an app to help people in recovery from alcohol and drug addiction find and connect with one another for peer support
 Sober Meal, painting by Pieter Franciscus Dierckx
 Sober space, type of sobriety of a topological space in mathematics
 Sober living houses
 Sober (worm), a family of computer worms